John Rafael Edholm (born 8 May 1966) is a Swedish actor, film director, screenwriter and model. In the SVT series The spiral which was broadcast in 2012, Edholm played the police Gunnarson, where one of his opponents was Tuva Novotny.

He was married to Görel Crona 1997–2006 (with one son, Gabriel) and after that married Daga Lamy until the spring of 2011.

Filmography
1999 – The One and Only
1999 – Anna Holt – polis (TV)
2000 – Järngänget
2000 – Vingar av glas
2000 – Reuter & Skoog (TV)
2001 – Livvakterna
2002 – Beck – Kartellen (TV film)
2003 – Hem till Midgård (TV)
2005 – Komplett galen (also director)
2006 – Göta kanal 2 – Kanalkampen
2006 – Babas bilar (also director and screenwriter)
2009 – Göta kanal 3: Kanalkungens hemlighet
2010 – Wallander – Indrivaren
2015 – An American Girl: Grace Stirs Up Success

References

External links
Akas IMDb
Bio
Swedish film database

Swedish screenwriters
Swedish male screenwriters
Swedish film directors
Swedish male models
1966 births
Living people
Male actors from Stockholm
Swedish people of Cuban descent